Hwang Ildong (born 1969), known as “D Hwang”, is a South Korean sculptor and painter.

Biography
D Hwang was born in Seoul, South Korea.
He had a childhood dream to be a custom motorcycle rider, in which he became both a rider and a designer. D Hwang created his own custom bike company called "MATTEBLACK" in which he was a designer of custom motorcycles. In 2003 and 2004, D Hwang won the Yokohama Hotrod Custom Show
(Japan) “Cool Bike Award".
His interest in film and video began in 1994 to 2003, D Hwang was involved with the production of films and music videos, which he was a filmmaker, director and screenplay writer for the entertainment industry. 2012 D Hwang is very much involved with the film industry of South Korea.
D Hwang obtained his BFA in 1997 from New York, Parsons The New School for Design.

GARAT Series
GS series
GS(GARAT Sculpture) series of Garage and Art, is Industrial Expressionism. D Hwang reveals emotions of himself as an artist, while he lives through oppressive systems of a contemporary society. The GS series gives D Hwang a sense of identity through his works of art.
He has said “With the start of a bit rebellious motivation, the theme of the GS series is ironically freedom, not oppression”. The GS series was created by welding metal materials from waste by-products of an industrial industry.
GARAT maintains a purely anarchistic position, revolting against the mainstream norm of "shock values of contemporary art".
GARAT re-discovers and practices the essential values of labor in art, something lost in contemporary art.

The GS-01 of the GS series, is in the shape of a motorcycle, its smooth curvy design is symbolic of speed and dynamics.

OGS-01 is the image of a tree, a natural shape with roots revealed. It is an Iron metal sculpture that was oxidized by water, which creates a natural alive look, with a design that gives it an illusion of movement.

Painting and mixed media work
D Hwang records his life through experimental variations of mediums in his works of art, seen with “Self-portrait II “(2007), and “Here Lie the Mortal Remains”series (2007-2008).

“ Zen In Disappearing Earth Series" is a crossover for D Hwang, he has said that “Zen In Disappearing Earth” (2009) is the bridge between industrial expressionism to minimal expressionism.” The mediums used are a mixture of oil on metal board, mixed media on wood board and wood, acrylic board. Zen in Disappearing Earth represents the experiences that have held D Hwang’s in isolation, during his journey as an evolving artist. He has exhibited his work around the globe.

Film
D Hwang has produced and directed films, and written screenplays since the mid-1990s. His most recent work is called “The Painter” Presented by Studio Garat, Directed by D Hwang South Korea. Starring Deok-ho Han as "The Painter".

Film and director

Exhibitions

References

External links
 D Hwang Website

South Korean painters
South Korean sculptors
Artists from Seoul
1969 births
Living people
20th-century South Korean male artists
21st-century South Korean male artists